Thomas Franklin McDonald (July 26, 1934 – September 24, 2018) was an American professional football player who was a flanker and halfback in the National Football League (NFL) for the Philadelphia Eagles, Dallas Cowboys, Los Angeles Rams, Atlanta Falcons, and Cleveland Browns. He played college football for the Oklahoma Sooners. He is a member of the Pro Football Hall of Fame and College Football Hall of Fame.

Early years
McDonald agreed to repeat the eighth grade, because his father felt the extra time would give him a chance to grow. He attended Roy High School in Roy, New Mexico, with an enrollment of around 150 students during his freshman year, where he played quarterback.

As a sophomore, he transferred to Highland High School in Albuquerque. As a senior, he averaged over 20 yards per carry in football and set the state scoring record with 157 points.

He also set the city scoring record in basketball, and won five gold medals in the state track meet (100, 220, low hurdles and 2 relays).

College career
McDonald accepted a football scholarship from the University of Oklahoma, after the Oklahoma basketball coach Bruce Drake, saw him play in an All-star football game in Albuquerque and encouraged him to have his parent write a letter to the football head coach Bud Wilkinson. Based on Drake's recommendation, Wilkinson invited McDonald to visit the school's campus and offered him a football scholarship soon thereafter.

In 1953, he spent the season on the freshman team. In 1954, he was a backup running back, registering 27 carries for 128 yards, 2 receptions for 28 yards and 2 touchdowns.

In 1955, he was named a starter at running back, tallying 114 carries for 715 yards (led the team), 16 rushing touchdowns (led the team), 7 receptions for 110 yards (second on the team) and one receiving touchdown (tied for the team lead). He also was a passer on the option play. He became the first player in school history to score a touchdown in every game of a season.

In 1956, he led the team with 119 carries for 853 yards, 12 rushing touchdowns, 12 receptions for 282 yards and 4 receiving touchdowns. At the end of the season he received the Maxwell Award as the nation's most outstanding college football player and finished third in the 1956 Heisman voting.

He excelled as a running back, never played in a losing game and was one of the key players during the school's 47-game winning streak. In 1985, he was inducted into the College Football Hall of Fame.

McDonald was also a member of the Delta Epsilon chapter of Sigma Nu fraternity while he was at Oklahoma.

Professional career

Philadelphia Eagles
McDonald was selected by the Philadelphia Eagles in the third round of the 1957 NFL Draft. As a rookie, he was moved to wide receiver after he replaced an injured Bill Stribling in the ninth game of the season, making a 61-yard reception and a 25-yard receiving touchdown from quarterback Sonny Jurgensen.

He was a part of the team that won the 1960 NFL Championship against Vince Lombardi’s Green Bay Packers. In the contest, he had a 35-yard touchdown reception from quarterback Norm Van Brocklin.

In 1961, he led the NFL in receiving yards (1,144) and touchdowns (13). Against the New York Giants, he had 7 receptions for 237 yards and 2 touchdowns, which still is a franchise single-game record.

On March, 20, 1964, he was traded to the Dallas Cowboys in exchange for Sam Baker, John Meyers, and Lynn Hoyem.

Dallas Cowboys
In 1964, he was switched from flanker to split end, because the Cowboys already had an accomplished flanker in Franklin Clarke and split end Billy Howton had just retired. Looking to improve the receiving corps to help the young quarterback Don Meredith, they also traded with the Pittsburgh Steelers to get Buddy Dial.

In his only season with the club, he registered 46 receptions for 612 yards (13.3 average) and 2 touchdowns (one of them against the Eagles). In 1965, with the emergence of rookie Bob Hayes he was traded to the Los Angeles Rams in exchange for placekicker Danny Villanueva on May 14.

Los Angeles Rams
McDonald recorded a career-high 67 passes for 1,036 yards and 9 touchdowns in 1965. He was selected to his last Pro Bowl. In 1967 he was traded to the Atlanta Falcons in exchange for a draft choice.

Atlanta Falcons
On September 10, 1968, he was waived following a season with 33 receptions for 436 yards and 4 touchdowns.

Cleveland Browns
In 1968, McDonald was picked up by the Cleveland Browns for whom he caught 7 receptions for 113 yards and one touchdown. With the retirement of Raymond Berry the previous year, McDonald was technically the league's active leader in career receiving yards during the off-season but was surpassed in Game 1 by Don Maynard.

His last NFL game was the 1968 NFL Championship Game against the Baltimore Colts. On March 15, 1969, he announced his retirement from pro football.

Legacy
McDonald was selected for six Pro Bowls, led the league in touchdown receptions twice (1958, 1961), and led the league in receiving yards once (1961). McDonald was the last non-kicker to play in the NFL without a facemask.

He finished his career with 495 receptions for 8,410 yards and 84 touchdowns, the second-highest total of touchdown receptions in NFL history at the time.  He also rushed for 22 yards and gained 1,459 yards and a touchdown returning punts and kickoffs on special teams, giving him 9,891 career all-purpose yards. He was inducted into the Pro Football Hall of Fame in 1998.

Personal life and death

Following the Eagles NFL Championship victory, McDonald wrote a biography: They Pay Me to Catch Footballs, published by Chilton in 1962.

He also dabbled in art. He owned Tommy McDonald Enterprises, a studio that did portrait paintings and plaques, mainly of athletes. He did not paint the portraits himself, but had two painters who created them, although he signed them as being by McDonald (Enterprises). A portrait of Joe DiMaggio sold at auction for $4,000.

He became great friends with Pro Football Hall of Fame writer, Ray Didinger, who was a huge fan of Tommy's during his time with the Eagles. As a child, Didinger would spend time with Tommy at Eagles training camp in Hershey, Pennsylvania. Didinger helped get Tommy into the Hall of Fame, and then went on to present Tommy into the Hall of Fame. Didinger also wrote a 75-minute play, "Tommy and Me" which tells the tale of Ray and Tommy. 

He died on September 24, 2018, at the age of 84. "Tommy McDonald lived life like he played the game of football," Pro Football Hall of Fame president and CEO C. David Baker said in a statement. "He was charismatic, passionate and had fun. He was such a character. Heaven is a happier place today.

References

External links
 
 
 

1934 births
2018 deaths
Players of American football from Albuquerque, New Mexico
American football halfbacks
American football wide receivers
Oklahoma Sooners football players
All-American college football players
College Football Hall of Fame inductees
Maxwell Award winners
Philadelphia Eagles players
Dallas Cowboys players
Los Angeles Rams players
Atlanta Falcons players
Cleveland Browns players
Eastern Conference Pro Bowl players
Pro Football Hall of Fame inductees
Western Conference Pro Bowl players
People from Harding County, New Mexico
Artists from New Mexico